The 2014 Sibiu Open was a professional tennis tournament played on clay courts. It was the third edition of the tournament which was part of the 2014 ATP Challenger Tour. It took place in Sibiu, Romania between 22 and 28 September 2014.

Singles main-draw entrants

Seeds

 1 Rankings are as of September 15, 2014.

Other entrants
The following players received wildcards into the singles main draw:
  Tudor Șulea
  Victor Vlad Cornea
  Bogdan Ionuț Apostol
  Lucian Gheorghe

The following players received entry from the qualifying draw:
  Michael Linzer
  Grzegorz Panfil
  Marek Semjan
  Miljan Zekić

Champions

Singles

 Jason Kubler def.  Radu Albot, 6–4, 6–1

Doubles

 Potito Starace /  Adrian Ungur def.  Marius Copil /  Alexandru-Daniel Carpen, 7–5, 6–2

External links
Official Website

Sibiu Open
Sibiu Open
September 2014 sports events in Romania
2014 in Romanian tennis